The Primetime Emmy Award for Outstanding Production Design for a Narrative Program (Half-Hour or Less) is an award handed out annually at the Creative Arts Emmy Awards. In 2014, the category was created alongside Outstanding Production Design for a Narrative Period Program (One Hour or More) and the Primetime Emmy Award for Outstanding Production Design for a Narrative Contemporary or Fantasy Program (One Hour or More).

Rules require that nominations are distributed proportionally among multi-camera and single-camera series, based on the number of submissions of each. For instance, if two-fifths of submissions are multi-camera then two of the five nominees will be multi-camera.

Winners and nominations

2000s
Outstanding Art Direction for a Multi-Camera Series

2010s

Outstanding Production Design for a Narrative Program (Half-Hour or Less)

2020s

Programs with multiple wins

4 wins
 How I Met Your Mother

3 wins
 Will & Grace

Programs with multiple nominations
Totals include nominations for Outstanding Art Direction for a Series.

9 nominations
 Will & Grace

8 nominations
 The Big Bang Theory
 How I Met Your Mother

5 nominations
 Silicon Valley
 Veep

4 nominations
 Frasier
 Friends

3 nominations
 Modern Family
 The New Adventures of Old Christine
 That '70s Show
 Transparent
 Two and a Half Men
 2 Broke Girls

2 nominations
 Barry
 Dharma & Greg
 Emily in Paris
 GLOW
 Grace and Frankie
 Hacks
 Hot in Cleveland
 The Mandalorian 
 Mike & Molly
 Rules of Engagement
 Ted Lasso
 United States of Al

Notes

References

Art Direction for a Contemporary Program (Half hour or less)
American reality television series